This is a complete list of cities and municipalities in the Philippines. The Philippines is administratively divided into 81 provinces. These, together with the National Capital Region, are further subdivided into cities and municipalities.

Cities are classified under the Local Government Code of 1991 (Republic Act No. 7160) into three categories: highly urbanized cities, independent component cities, and component cities. Cities are governed by their own municipal charters in addition to the Local Government Code of 1991, which specifies their administrative structure and powers. They are given a bigger share of the Internal Revenue Allotment (IRA) compared to regular municipalities.

As of December 17, 2022, there are 148 cities (33 highly urbanized, 5 independent component, 110 component) and 1,486 municipalities encompassing the country.

List 
Cities with provinces in italics denote that the city is administered independently from such provinces to which they are traditionally grouped with. Metro Manila (NCR) is not a province but is included for comparative purposes. Under class,  indicates municipalities,  indicates component cities,  independent component cities, and  highly urbanized cities. Cells with thick borders mark official (de jure) provincial capitals while cities/municipalities with asterisk(*) mark the province's largest settlement, double asterisk(**) marks the country's largest city and a yellow cell marks the national capital.

Map

See also 
 List of cities in the Philippines
 List of renamed cities and municipalities in the Philippines

References 

Philippines, Cities
Cities and Municipalities
 
Cities
Cities